In 1979, Honda introduced a series of light motorcycles in the US and in Europe. Honda's production lines of these models were in Spain, Belgium and Sweden.
 
Both the Honda MB road-model and the Honda MT offroad-model motorcycles were released in Europe and South Africa. The MB was made from 1979 to 1987 in Europe and in the U.S. up until 1982. In Europe however the MT50 production would last until 1997.

Both models came in 2 versions; 80 and 50 cc, two-stroke. Honda left its four-stroke program temporarily because it was aimed at the European and South African moped markets for 16-year-olds, the legal age at which someone could ride a 50 cc motorcycle in South Africa and most European countries.

The MB model was standard equipped with a speedometer, rpm counter, front disc brake and Honda Comstar wheels. Because of its success Honda released the MT series, a naked off-road version, on the European and South African markets.

The result of this move was that sales in Europe and South Africa greatly increased. The MT series earned its popularity because of the large numbers of original and imitation parts that were available as well as its off-road ability due to high ground clearance.

In parallel with the MB and MT series, Honda released air-cooled MBX and MTX 50 & 80 cc models.  Unlike the MT50 which had a 5 speed gearbox, the MTX50 had a six speed 'box plus a HERP chamber on the exhaust.  In 1983, Honda released a water-cooled successor to both the MB/MT and air-cooled MBX/MTX series, the MTX50/80RFD and the MBX50/80.  In 1985, the MTX50/80RFD was revised cosmetically into the MTX50/80RFF.  This, in turn became the MTX50/80RII, a motorcycle based around the existing MTX125/200R motorcycles. The MVX250 was clearly the big brother of the MBX series, with the added 'V' in the name highlighting the use of a V3 engine

Because of important law and insurance changes the sales in these types of light motorcycles decreased enormously. As a result, production in Spain and Belgium came to a standstill in 1992. MBX production lasted another year and stopped in 1993. Only in Scandinavia a limited production for the local market lasted until 1997. After that Honda's M productions came to an end.

There were 50, 80, 125 variants of both the MBX and MTX as well as a 200c version of the MTX  - all two-stroke singles - and the related MVX250 water-cooled two-stroke V3. The MTX125/200R started life in 1983 as RFD models and were ungraded in 1985 into the RFF.  Changes includes dropping the drum brake at the front and replacing with a disc, bigger forks, revised graphics, a revised rear shock, revised CDI and, in the case of the 200, a new swingarm.  The 125 cc motorcycle come in both restricted and de-restricted form.  The de-restricted version and the 200 cc version had ATAC chambers operated by a piston valve attached to a mechanical governor.

The stock MB8 uses a two-ring 45mm piston and 50.8mm stroke – compared to the 41mm stroke of the MB5

References

Honda Corp Japan

External links
Website Honda motorcycles

MB T X series
Two-stroke motorcycles